J. D. Denis Pelletier (born December 4, 1948) is a judge currently serving on the Canadian Federal Court of Appeal.

References

Sources

1948 births
Living people
Judges of the Federal Court of Appeal (Canada)